The Toro Rosso STR10 is a Formula One racing car which Scuderia Toro Rosso used to compete in the 2015 Formula One season. It was driven by Max Verstappen and Carlos Sainz, Jr.

Design 
The car was launched on 31 January 2015. Toro Rosso introduced an extensively modified STR10 for the final pre-season tests at the Barcelona circuit in late February, with a shorter nose, new aerodynamics and a new suspension. According to the team's technical director, James Key, this revised STR10 was "actually the 'real' racecar."

Racing history 
The car proved quite competitive throughout the season, managing to score 67 points and a pair of 4th places for Verstappen in the Hungarian and United States Grands Prix. The results allowed Toro Rosso to end the season with 7th place in the World Constructors' Championship, 11 points behind the Mercedes-powered Lotus. This was the last Renault-engine Toro Rosso, before the team returned to Ferrari power units for the  season.

Complete Formula One results
(key) (results in bold indicate pole position; results in italics indicate fastest lap)

 Driver failed to finish the race, but was classified as they had completed greater than 90% of the race distance.

Notes

References

External links
Scuderia Toro Rosso STR10 car specifications

Toro Rosso STR10
2015 Formula One season cars